Drosophila calloptera is a species of vinegar fly in the Immigrans-tripunctata radiation of the subgenus Drosophila.

References

calloptera
Insects described in 1862